Rafael Leonardo Cámara Anaya (6 November 1904 – 14 April 1969) was a Mexican fencer. He competed in the individual sabre event at the 1952 Summer Olympics.

References

External links
 

1904 births
1969 deaths
Mexican male sabre fencers
Olympic fencers of Mexico
Fencers at the 1952 Summer Olympics